State football leagues in India represent the top state-level of the Indian football league system. There are currently a total of 37 state associations affiliated with the national governing body, the All India Football Federation.

Most of the state associations organise and have own affiliated football competitions in their respective states. The state leagues operate as a system of promotion and relegation with the I-League 2, Indian Women's League and lower regional leagues. Clubs of top national leagues (Indian Super League and I-League) also participate in their respective state leagues, most often with youth or reserve teams.

Eastern leagues

Northern leagues

North-Eastern leagues

Southern leagues

Western leagues

States/UTs with no permanent league

North zone
 Chandigarh (UT)
 Haryana
 Ladakh (UT)

South zone
 Andaman and Nicobar Islands (UT)
 Andhra Pradesh

See also
 History of Indian football
 List of football clubs in India
 IFA Shield
 Durand Cup
 Super Cup
 Futsal Club Championship
 Santosh Trophy

 Related abroad competitions:
 Japanese Regional Leagues
 National Premier Leagues

References

All India Football Federation
Association football in India lists
Fourth level football leagues in Asia